Hibbing is a city in Saint Louis County, Minnesota, United States. The population was 16,214 at the 2020 census. The city was built on mining the rich iron ore of the Mesabi Iron Range and still relies on that industrial activity today. At the edge of town is the world's largest open-pit iron mine, the Hull–Rust–Mahoning Open Pit Iron Mine. It is the hometown of famous singer Bob Dylan and former Governor of Minnesota Rudy Perpich.

The main routes in Hibbing are U.S. Highway 169, State Highway 37, State Highway 73, Howard Street, and 1st Avenue.

History
The town was founded in 1893 by Frank Hibbing, born in Walsrode, Germany on December 1, 1856, and christened Franz Dietrich von Ahlen. His mother died when he was still in infancy and it was her name, Hibbing, which he assumed when he set out to seek his fortune in the New World. He first settled in Beaver Dam, Wisconsin, where he worked on a farm and in a shingle mill. Injured in a mill accident, he considered becoming a lawyer, but after deciding he was not familiar enough with the English language to make a legal career possible, he turned to timber cruising.

In 1887, Hibbing settled in Duluth where he established a real estate business and began explorations on the Vermilion Range. In 1892, he headed a party of thirty men at Mountain Iron and cut a road through the wilderness to Section 22, 58–20. An expert iron ore prospector, he soon discovered the surface indication which led him to believe in the existence of extensive ore deposits.

In July 1893, the townsite of Hibbing was laid out and named in honor of him. Feeling personally responsible, he took the deepest pride in its development and, by his generous aid, made its progress possible. He used his personal means to provide a water plant, electric light plant, the first roads, hotel, sawmill, and bank building. For the last ten years of his life, Hibbing made his home in Duluth, where many of his business interests were centered. He retained close contact with the community which bore his name, until he died of appendicitis on July 30, 1897, at age forty.

In 1914, two men, Carl Wickman and Andrew "Bus Andy" Anderson, started a bus line between Hibbing and Alice, Minnesota, which would eventually become Greyhound Lines, the world's largest bus transportation company.

Hibbing Heights was platted in 1908 and annexed by Alice in 1910, when Alice incorporated as a city. Between 1919 and 1921, the Village of Hibbing was moved immediately south of Alice and then annexed Alice in 1920. Hibbing remained a village until 1979 when the Town of Stuntz was annexed. An Article of Incorporation was filed in July 1979 with the state and Hibbing became a city from that action in January 1980.

Hibbing is home to the world's largest iron ore mine, which was discovered by Leonidas Merritt. Hibbing grew rapidly in its early years as the huge iron ore mines such as the Mahoning, Hull, Rust, Sellers, and Burt provided the raw material for America's industrial revolution. In fact, the mines encroached on the village from the east, north, and west and it was determined that some of the ore body actually went under the town whose population had hit 20,000 by 1915.

Negotiations between the Oliver Mining Company and the village finally brought about a plan whereby the entire village would relocate to a site two miles south near Alice. The company, for its part, agreed to develop the downtown buildings with low interest loans that could be paid off over the years by the retailers. New civic structures such as Hibbing High School, the Androy Hotel, the Village Hall, and the Rood Hospital were also constructed with mining company money. In all, about 200 structures were moved down the First Avenue Highway, as it was called, to the new city. These included a store and even a couple of large hotels. Only one structure did not make it: the Sellers Hotel tumbled off some rollers and crashed to the ground leaving, as one witness said, "an enormous pile of kindling". The move started in 1919 and the first phase was completed in 1921. Known today as "North Hibbing", this area remained as a business and residential center through the 1940s when the mining companies bought the remaining structures. The last house was moved in 1968.

On July 25, 1979, Hibbing annexed the Town of Stuntz which comprised five townships. With this annexation, the following unincorporated communities were also annexed (community location by township, range and section indicated):

 Brooklyn (T57N, R20W, Section 6)
 Burton (T57N, R20W, Section 8)
 Darrow (T56N, R20W, Section 31)
 Dunwoody Junction (T57N, R20W, Section 3)
 Frederick (T56N, R20W, Section 18)
 Kelly Lake (T57N, R21W, Sections 16 and 21)
 Kerr (T57N, R21W, Section 14)
 Kitzville (T57N, R20W, Section 5)
 Lavinia (T58N, R21W, Section 25)
 Leetonia (T57N, R21W, Section 15)
 Leighton (T56N, R21W, Section 9)
 Little Swan (T56N, R20W, intersection of Sections 25, 26, 35 and 36)
 Mahoning (T57N, R21W, Section 2)
 Mitchell (T57N, R20W, Section 4)
 Onega (or Omega in some documents) (T56N, R20W, Section 24)
 Powers (T58N, R21W, Section 23)
 Redore (T57N, R20W, Section 5)
 Riley (T56N, R21W, Section 1)
 Ruby Junction (T57N, R20W, Section 7)
 Scranton (T57N, R21W, Section 13)
 Sims (T56N, R21W, Section 16)
 Stevenson (or Stephenson in some documents) (T58N, R21W, Section 7)
 Stuart (T56N, R21W, Section 29)
 Wilpen (T57N, R20W, Section 2)

On December 1, 1993, Northwest Airlink Flight 5719 crashed near Hibbing, killing all 18 people on board.

Geography
McCarthy Beach State Park is nearby.

The Northern Divide intersects the St. Lawrence Divide near Hibbing, with waters draining to the Arctic Ocean, the Gulf of Mexico and the Great Lakes.

Climate
Hibbing has a humid continental climate (Koppen: Dfb), experiencing all four seasons, but with long, drawn out winters. Summers are generally warm to hot, while winters are generally cold to severely cold. A freeze has been recorded for every month of the year.

Demographics

2020 census
As of the census of 2020, the population was 16,214. The racial makeup of the city was 91.3% White, 1.5% Black or African American, 0.9% Native American, 0.5% Asian, 0.1% Pacific Islander, 0.4% from other races, and 5.4% from two or more races. Ethnically, the population was 1.6% Hispanic or Latino of any race.

2010 census
As of the census of 2010, there were 16,361 people, 7,414 households, and 4,325 families living in the city. The racial makeup of the city was 95.9% White, 0.6% African American, 0.9% Native American, 0.4% Asian, 0.3% from other races, and 1.9% from two or more races. Hispanic or Latino of any race were 1.1% of the population.

There were 7,414 households, of which 26.3% had children under the age of 18 living with them, 42.5% were married couples living together, 11.1% had a female householder with no husband present, 4.8% had a male householder with no wife present, and 41.7% were non-families. 36.4% of all households were made up of individuals, and 14.8% had someone living alone who was 65 years of age or older. The average household size was 2.17 and the average family size was 2.80.

The median age in the city was 42.5 years. 21.6% of residents were under the age of 18; 8.6% were between the ages of 18 and 24; 22.7% were from 25 to 44; 29.4% were from 45 to 64; and 17.8% were 65 years of age or older. The gender makeup of the city was 48.4% male and 51.6% female.

2000 census
As of the census of 2000, there were 17,071 people, 7,439 households, and 4,597 families living in the city. The racial makeup of the city was 97.33% White, 0.46% Black, 0.73% Native American, 0.27% Asian, 0.01% Pacific Islander, 0.19% from other races, and 1.01% from two or more races. Hispanic or Latino of any race were 0.68% of the population. 17.1% were of German, 12.4% Finnish, 10.5% Norwegian, 9.4% Italian, 6.4% Irish and 5.9% Swedish ancestry.

There were 7,439 households, out of which 27.7% had children under the age of 18 living with them, 48.3% were married couples living together, 9.6% had a female householder with no husband present, and 38.2% were non-families. 33.5% of all households were made up of individuals, and 15.5% had someone living alone who was 65 years of age or older. The average household size was 2.24 and the average family size was 2.86.

In the city, the population was spread out, with 22.8% under the age of 18, 9.1% from 18 to 24, 24.5% from 25 to 44, 23.8% from 45 to 64, and 19.8% who were 65 years of age or older. The median age was 41 years. For every 100 females, there were 93.1 males. For every 100 females age 18 and over, there were 89.4 males.

The median income for a household in the city was $33,346, and the median income for a family was $43,558. Males had a median income of $38,064 versus $22,183 for females. The per capita income for the city was $18,561. About 8.1% of families and 11.7% of the population were below the poverty line, including 16.3% of those under age 18 and 8.2% of those age 65 or over.

Government

Education
Hibbing is home to Hibbing Community College, a two-year community and technical college.

Media

AM
 1240 kHz WMFG

FM
 88.7 MHz WHPJ
 89.3 MHz K207ES
 90.1 MHz KADU
 93.9 MHz WTBX
 98.3 MHz W252AN
 106.3 MHz WMFG-FM

TV
 13 WIRT-DT
 31 WRPT

Newspapers
The Hibbing Daily Tribune newspaper was founded in Hibbing in 1893 and served readers in Saint Louis County. In 2020 it was combined with the Mesabi Daily News to create the Mesabi Tribune., of Virginia, Minnesota. The Mesabi is also owned by Adams Publishing Group. It is published daily, except Monday, with a circulation of 3,749 in 2019. The newspaper is currently owned by the Adams Publishing Group.

Notable people

 Corey Adam, stand-up comedian
 Bernard J Bischoff, Minnesota state representative and judge
 Joe Bretto, professional ice hockey player, Chicago Blackhawks
 Milton Brink, ice hockey player
 Vincent Bugliosi, prosecutor of serial killer Charles Manson
 Bruce Carlson, United States Air Force general, director of National Reconnaissance Office
 Carl Mario D'Aquila, Minnesota state representative, journalist, and businessman
 Steve Deger, juvenile nonfiction author
 Bob Dylan (born Robert Zimmerman in Duluth), musician, singer-songwriter, Rock and Roll Hall of Famer, winner of 2016 Nobel Prize in Literature
 Ron Dicklich, Minnesota state senator
 Steve Enich, professional football player
 Jack Fena, Minnesota state representative and judge
 Dick Garmaker, professional basketball player
 Gus Hall, former leader of Communist Party USA and four-time US presidential candidate
 Jeff Halper, professor of anthropology, author, activist, co-founder of Israeli Committee Against House Demolitions
 Rufus Wilber Hitchcock, newspaper editor, educator, and Minnesota state legislator
 Karl Jacob (born and raised), actor and filmmaker
 Carl Jacobson, Minnesotastate representative and businessman
 Chi Chi LaRue, film director
 Bob Latz, Minnesota state representative and lawyer
 Roger Maris, professional baseball player, broke Babe Ruth's single-season home run record
 Kevin McHale, professional basketball player, won three NBA championships with Boston Celtics, named one of 50 Greatest Players in NBA History; served as Minnesota Timberwolves' vice president and as head coach of Houston Rockets, broadcaster for NBA on TNT
 Bethany McLean, co-author of Enron: The Smartest Guys in the Room
 Joe Micheletti, professional ice hockey player, Olympics and NHL television analyst in NYC, won two NCAA championships with Minnesota Golden Gophers
 Pat Micheletti, professional ice hockey player, younger brother of Joe
 Robert Mondavi, wine entrepreneur
 Lona Minne, Minnesota state representative
 Timothy Murphy, poet and businessman
 Marie Myung-Ok Lee, novelist and essayist
 Carol J. Oja, music historian at Harvard University
 Benjamin B. Patterson, Minnesota state senator and businessman
 Jeno Paulucci, founder of Jeno's Pizza and Chun King Foods brands
 Rudy Perpich, Hibbing dentist who served two terms as Governor of Minnesota
 Scott Perunovich, 2020 Hobey Baker Award winner; St Louis Blues defenseman
 Elmer Peter Peterson, Minnesota state legislator and electrician
 John (Jack) Petroske, member of 1956 U.S. Olympic Hockey Team, winning a silver medal
 Gary Puckett, lead singer and namesake of 1960s band Gary Puckett and the Union Gap was born in Hibbing
 Frank Riley, co-winner of second Hugo Award for Best Novel, was born in Hibbing
 Scott Sandelin, professional ice hockey player, won two NCAA championships with North Dakota Fighting Sioux and three as head coach of Minnesota–Duluth Bulldogs men's ice hockey
 John P. Sheehy, internationally known architect
 Rudy Sikich, football player
 John J. Spanish, Minnesota state representative
 Carl Wickman, founder and longtime CEO of Greyhound Lines

In popular culture
Hibbing is featured as a setting for two episodes of the fantasy horror television series, Supernatural.

Sister cities
 Walsrode, Lower Saxony (Germany)

Notes

References

External links

 

 
1893 establishments in Minnesota
Bob Dylan
Populated places established in 1893